Kletnyansky District is an administrative and municipal district (raion), one of the twenty-seven in Bryansk Oblast, Russia. It is located in the northwest of the oblast. Its administrative center is the urban locality (a work settlement) of Kletnya. Population:   22,501 (2002 Census);  The population of Kletnya accounts for 70.1% of the district's total population.

References

Notes

Sources

Districts of Bryansk Oblast